Pole bending is a timed event that features a horse and one mounted rider, running a weaving or serpentine path around six poles arranged in a line. This event is usually seen in high school rodeos and 4-H events as well as American Quarter Horse Association, Paint, and Appaloosa sanctioned shows as well as at many gymkhana or O-Mok-See events.

Nez Perce Stake Race 

The Nez Perce Stake Race is a type of pole bending race which is also a match race: two horses race on identical courses laid out side-by-side, with the loser eliminated and the winner moving up the brackets to race the other winners. It is not a timed event. It is one of five game classes approved for horse club shows by the Appaloosa Horse Club (ApHC). The ApHC rules state that racing competition is traditional to the Nez Perce Native American people.  However, it is unclear if this particular competition is derived from any traditional competition.

References

External links 
 Pole Bending Event Information  From Pro Rodeo Online
 National Pole Bending Association (2009). Retrieved from http://www.polebending.org.
 Smith, Ken. (2009, July 15). Ken and Pat Smith, Sunrise West Quarter Horses, LLC. Retrieved from http://www.sunrisewest.com/help.html
National Little Britches Rodeo Association
National High School Rodeo Association

Western-style riding
Rodeo-affiliated events
Mounted games

de:Westernreiten#Pole Bending